William Allin Møller (born 10 March 1998) is a retired Danish football player.

Club career
He made his Danish Superliga debut for Esbjerg fB on 13 August 2018 in a game against SønderjyskE. He left Esbjerg at the end of the 2018/19 season.

On 1 August 2019, Møller joined Danish 2nd Division club FC Sydvest 05.

On 12 October 2020 he signed with fourth-tier German club Preußen Münster. After one season in Germany, 23-year old Møller announced his retirement on 8 June 2021, because he wanted to join the military.

References

External links
 

1998 births
Living people
Danish men's footballers
Association football forwards
Esbjerg fB players
SC Preußen Münster players
Danish 2nd Division players
Danish 1st Division players
Danish Superliga players
Danish expatriate men's footballers
Danish expatriate sportspeople in Germany
Expatriate footballers in Germany
FC Sydvest 05 players